John Clement Du Buisson (12 October 1871 – 18 April 1938) was an Anglican priest.

Du Buisson was born into an ecclesiastical family and educated at Hereford Cathedral School and Magdalen College, Oxford. Ordained in 1897, he began his career with a curacy at Hawarden after which he was Subwarden then Warden of Bishop's Hostel, Lincoln. He was then Warden of St Deiniol's Library. until his appointment in 1921 as Dean of St Asaph

References

1871 births
1938 deaths
Alumni of Magdalen College, Oxford
Deans of St Asaph
People educated at Hereford Cathedral School